Taeniorrhiza is a monotypic genus of flowering plants from the orchid family, Orchidaceae. The sole species is Taeniorrhiza gabonensis. It is native to Gabon and the Democratic Republic of the Congo in central Africa.

See also 
 List of Orchidaceae genera

References

External links
African Orchids, Taeniorrhiza gabonensis Summerh., Bot. Mus. Leafl. 11: 166 (1943).

Monotypic Epidendroideae genera
Vandeae genera
Angraecinae
Orchids of Africa